Pascale Casanova is a French Paralympic Gold medallist.

She won two gold medals, and a silver at the 2006 Winter Paralympics in Turin.

She has won eleven medals in her career.

References

External links
 
 
 
 

Paralympic gold medalists for France
Paralympic silver medalists for France
Living people
Medalists at the 2006 Winter Paralympics
French female alpine skiers
Year of birth missing (living people)
Paralympic medalists in alpine skiing
Alpine skiers at the 1998 Winter Paralympics
Alpine skiers at the 2002 Winter Paralympics
Alpine skiers at the 2006 Winter Paralympics
Paralympic alpine skiers of France